Aqueel Ansari (born 2 June 1972) is a former Indian International football player who played as a midfielder. He has played for India in few matches including the Nehru Cup in 1993 and 1997.  At the club level, Ansari had played for clubs like Mohammaden Sporting and Bengal Mumbai FC.

Honours

India
SAFF Championship: 1993; runner-up: 1995
 South Asian Games Gold medal: 1995

Maharashtra
Santosh Trophy: 1999–2000

References

Indian footballers
India international footballers
1972 births
Living people
Association football midfielders
East Bengal Club players
Mohammedan SC (Kolkata) players
Bengal Mumbai FC players
South Asian Games medalists in football
South Asian Games gold medalists for India